The Samoyedic people (also Samodeic people)<ref name="SJI">Some ethnologists use the term 'Samodeic people' instead 'Samoyedic', see </ref> are a group of closely related peoples who speak Samoyedic languages, which are part of the Uralic family. They are a linguistic, ethnic, and cultural grouping. The name derives from the obsolete term Samoyed'' (meaning "self-eater" in Russian) used in Russia for some indigenous people of Siberia.

Peoples

Contemporary

Extinct
Yurats, who spoke Yurats (Northern Samoyeds)
Mators or Motors, who spoke Mator (Southern Samoyeds)
Kamasins, who spoke Kamassian (Southern Samoyeds) (in the last two censuses, two people identified still as Kamasin under the subgroup "other nationalities".)

The largest of the Samoyedic peoples are the Nenets, who mainly live in two autonomous districts of Russia: Yamalo-Nenetsia and Nenetsia. Some of the Nenets and most of the Enets and Nganasans used to live in the Taymyria autonomous district (formerly known as Dolgano-Nenetsia), but today this area is a territory with special status within Krasnoyarsk Krai. Most of the Selkups live in Yamalo-Nenetsia, but there is also a significant population in Tomsk Oblast.

Gallery

References and notes

External links